The rusty-winged barbtail (Premnornis guttuliger) is a species of bird in the ovenbird family Furnariidae. It is the only member of the genus Premnornis. It is found in Bolivia, Colombia, Ecuador, Peru, and Venezuela, where its natural habitat is subtropical or tropical moist montane forest.

Within the ovenbird family, the rusty-winged barbtail is most closely related to the tufted-cheeks in the genus Pseudocolaptes.

Two subspecies are recognised:
 P. g. venezuelanus Phelps, WH & Phelps, WH Jr, 1956 – northwest Venezuela
 P. g. guttuliger (Sclater, PL, 1864) – Colombia, Ecuador and Peru

References

rusty-winged barbtail
Birds of the Northern Andes
rusty-winged barbtail
rusty-winged barbtail
Taxonomy articles created by Polbot